Jeyran Sharif is an Iranian actress. She is best known for her role in films such as Matarsak (The Scarecrow), for which she won a Best Supporting Actress prize at the Fajr International Film Festival, and the war drama Hesar (Fence).

See also
List of Iranian actresses

References

20th-century Iranian actresses
Living people
Year of birth missing (living people)
Place of birth missing (living people)
Iranian film actresses